Pío del Río Hortega (1882 – 1945) was a Spanish neuroscientist who discovered microglia.

Biography
Río Hortega was born in Portillo, Valladolid on 5 May 1882. He studied locally and qualified to practice medicine in 1905. He obtained his doctorate at the University of Madrid by researching the pathology of brain tumours. In 1913, he was funded to study research histology in France and Germany but the outbreak of war between them forced him to return to Spain.

He worked with the histologist Santiago Ramón y Cajal and briefly with Wilder Penfield. Ramón y Cajal discovered neurons, Penfield helped explain oligodendroglia, whilst Rio Hortega discovered microglia, which are the cells that protect the brain from infection.

He managed to identify microglia between 1919 and 1921 by staining the cells with silver carbonate. His method of staining also led to the discovery of oligodendroglia in 1921, which both he and Penfield are now credited with. However it was Rio Hortega who named the cells.

His discoveries in 1920 created issues with Ramón y Cajal, who led the lab, as he had earlier won the Nobel Prize. By 1931 del Río Hortega was leading Spain's cancer institute, but he left the country when the civil war broke out in 1936.

War spreading across Europe found him in Paris at the Pitié-Salpêtrière Hospital before he went to the University of Oxford to work with the British neurosurgeon Hugh Cairns. The bombing of Britain by Germany in World War II drove him on to Argentina in August 1940. His move was funded by the Spanish Cultural Institute, who continued to support him as he created his own laboratory in 1942. In Buenos Aires he developed a fruitful scientific school with former disciples who worked with him in Europe (Moisés Polak -http://www.patologia.es/volumen35/vol35-num4/pdf%20patologia%2035-4/35-4-18.pdf-, Washington Buño -https://www.smu.org.uy/dpmc/hmed/historia/articulos/buno-bio-biblio.pdf-) and new ones, including chronologically the last one, Amanda Pellegrino de Iraldi (https://www.frontiersin.org/articles/10.3389/fnana.2021.666938/full). Río Hortega died in Buenos Aires on 1 June 1945 from a malignant neoplasm.

References

1882 births
1945 deaths
People from Valladolid
Spanish neuroscientists
University of Valladolid alumni
Histologists
Spanish LGBT scientists
Deaths from cancer in Argentina